GCL may refer to:

Computing
 GNU Common Lisp
 Guarded Command Language, used for predicate transformer semantics
 Graphical Command Language of Geomview

Honours
 Grand Companion of the Order of Logohu, an honour of Papua New Guinea
 Grand Cross of the Order of Liberty, an honour of Portugal

Science
 Ganglion cell layer
 Geosynthetic clay liner
 Glutamate–cysteine ligase
 Global coordination level

Sports
 Golf Club of Lebanon
 Greater Catholic League, an Ohio high school athletic conference
 Gulf Coast League, a rookie-level Minor League Baseball league

Transport
 Glassboro–Camden Line, a proposed light rail line between Camden and Glassboro in New Jersey
 Gul Circle MRT station, a Mass Rapid Transit station in Tuas, Singapore (MRT station abbreviation)
 Gulf Coast Lines, a defunct American railway company

Other uses
 GCL-Poly, Golden Concord Group Limited, a green energy company
 Government Category List, in the United Kingdom
 Grenadian Creole English, ISO 639-3 code gcl
 Griffith College Limerick, in Ireland